Upper Crystal Creek is a town located in north-eastern New South Wales, Australia, in the Tweed Shire.

Demographics

The median age of the Upper Crystal Creek population was 46 years, 9 years above the national median of 37.

78.1% of people living in Upper Crystal Creek were born in Australia. The other top responses for country of birth were England 5.3%, Germany 3.2%, Zimbabwe 2.1%, New Zealand 2.1%, Italy 1.6%, 12.2% other countries.

88.2% of people spoke only English at home; the next most common languages were 2.1% Finnish, 1.6% German, 1.6% French, 1.6% Italian, 1.6% Spanish, 6.9% other languages.

References 

Suburbs of Tweed Heads, New South Wales